As of 19 August 2018, the IUCN Red List of Threatened Species has identified 3,005 critically endangered species, subspecies, stocks and subpopulations in the Animalia kingdom.

Annelida

Clitellata

Megadrilaceae

Lumbricidae

Megascolecidae

Opisthopora

Acanthodrilidae

Octochaetidae

Polychaeta

Nerillida

Nerillidae

Arthropoda

Arachnida

Araneae

Barychelidae

Corinnidae

Ctenidae

Ctenizidae

Gnaphosidae

Linyphiidae

Liphistiidae

Lycosidae

Miturgidae
(Includes former Zoridae.)

Ochyroceratidae

Oonopidae

Palpimanidae

Pholcidae

Salticidae

Segestriidae

Symphytognathidae

Telemidae

Theraphosidae

Theridiidae

Theridiosomatidae

Holothyrida

Holothyridae

Opiliones

Biantidae

Podoctidae

Samoidae

Pseudoscorpiones

Geogarypidae

Schizomida

Hubbardiidae

Scorpiones

Buthidae

Branchiopoda

Anostraca

Branchinectidae

Chirocephalidae

Streptocephalidae

Thamnocephalidae

Chilopoda

Geophilomorpha

Ballophilidae

Mecistocephalidae

Diplopoda

Polydesmida

Paradoxosomatidae

Polyzoniida

Siphonotidae

Sphaerotheriida

Arthrosphaeridae

Spirobolida

Pachybolidae

Spirobolellidae

Spirostreptida

Spirostreptidae

Stemmiulida

Stemmiulidae

Entognatha

Collembola

Hypogastruridae

Tullbergiidae

Insecta

Blattodea

Blattellidae

Polyphagidae

Coleoptera

Anthribidae

Carabidae

Cerambycidae

Chrysomelidae

Cicindelidae

Curculionidae

Dytiscidae

Elateridae

Geotrupidae

Laemophloeidae

Leiodidae

Lucanidae

Ptinidae

Rhadalidae

Scarabaeidae

Silphidae

Staphylinidae

Tenebrionidae

Zopheridae

Dermaptera

Carcinophoridae

Labiidae

Grylloblattodea

Grylloblattidae

Hemiptera

Cixiidae

Pseudococcidae

Psyllidae

Triozidae

Hymenoptera

Andrenidae

Apidae

Formicidae

Megachilidae

Isoptera

Kalotermitidae

Lepidoptera

Geometridae

Lycaenidae

Noctuidae

Nymphalidae

Papilionidae

Pieridae

Pterophoridae

Pyralidae

Sphingidae

Stathmopodidae

Tineidae

Mantodea

Mantidae

Odonata

Argiolestidae

Calopterygidae

Chlorocyphidae

Chlorogomphidae

Coenagrionidae

Cordulegastridae

Euphaeidae

Gomphidae

Heteragrionidae

Lestidae

Libellulidae

Macromiidae

Megapodagrionidae

Not Assigned

Pentaphlebiidae

Perilestidae

Platycnemididae

Platystictidae

Orthoptera

Acrididae

Dericorythidae

Euschmidtiidae

Gryllidae

Lentulidae

Mogoplistidae

Pamphagidae

Pyrgacrididae

Pyrgomorphidae

Rhaphidophoridae

Tetrigidae

Tettigoniidae

Thericleidae

Trigonidiidae

Phasmatodea

Diapheromeridae

Lonchodidae

Phasmatidae

Phthiraptera

Haematopinidae

Plecoptera

Gripopterygidae

Malacostraca

Amphipoda

Bogidiellidae

Gammaridae

Hadziidae

Ingolfiellidae

Liljeborgiidae

Paramelitidae

Phoxocephalidae

Decapoda

Astacidae

Atyidae

Cambaridae

Gecarcinucidae

Hippolytidae

Palaemonidae

Parastacidae

Potamidae

Potamonautidae

Procarididae

Pseudothelphusidae

Sesarmidae

Isopoda

Anthuridae

Armadillidae

Atlantasellidae

Cirolanidae

Sphaeromatidae

Mictacea

Mictocarididae

Mysida

Mysidae

Maxillopoda

Calanoida

Epacteriscidae

Pseudocyclopiidae

Cyclopoida

Speleoithonidae

Misophrioida

Misophriidae

Platycopioida

Platycopiidae

Ostracoda

Halocyprida

Halocyprididae

Podocopida

Cyprididae

Chordata

Actinopterygii

Acipenseriformes

Acipenseridae

Polyodontidae
Psephurus gladius

Anguilliformes

Anguillidae

Atheriniformes

Atherinidae

Atherinopsidae

Bedotiidae

Melanotaeniidae

Pseudomugilidae

Beloniformes

Adrianichthyidae

Characiformes

Alestidae

Characidae

Distichodontidae

Lebiasinidae

Clupeiformes

Clupeidae

Cypriniformes

Balitoridae

Catostomidae

Cobitidae

Cyprinidae

Psilorhynchidae

Cyprinodontiformes

Cyprinodontidae

Fundulidae

Goodeidae

Nothobranchiidae

Poeciliidae

Rivulidae

Valenciidae

Gadiformes

Macrouridae

Gasterosteiformes

Gasterosteidae

Lophiiformes

Brachionichthyidae

Ophidiiformes

Bythitidae

Osmeriformes

Galaxiidae

Osmeridae

Perciformes

Blenniidae

Callionymidae

Cichlidae

Datnioididae

Elassomatidae

Eleotridae

Epinephelidae

Gobiidae

Labrisomidae

Osphronemidae

Percichthyidae

Percidae

Polyprionidae

Pomacentridae

Sciaenidae

Scombridae

Sparidae

Percopsiformes

Amblyopsidae

Salmoniformes

Salmonidae

Scorpaeniformes

Cottidae

Sebastidae

Siluriformes

Ariidae

Astroblepidae

Bagridae

Clariidae

Heptapteridae

Ictaluridae

Loricariidae

Mochokidae

Pangasiidae

Pimelodidae

Siluridae

Sisoridae

Trichomycteridae

Syngnathiformes

Syngnathidae

Tetraodontiformes

Tetraodontidae

Amphibia

Anura

Alsodidae

Alytidae

Aromobatidae

Arthroleptidae

Brevicipitidae

Bufonidae

Centrolenidae

Ceratobatrachidae

Conrauidae

Craugastoridae

Cycloramphidae

Dendrobatidae

Dicroglossidae

Eleutherodactylidae

Heleophrynidae

Hemiphractidae

Hylidae

Hyperoliidae

Leiopelmatidae

Leptodactylidae

Limnodynastidae

Mantellidae

Megophryidae

Micrixalidae

Microhylidae

Myobatrachidae

Nyctibatrachidae

Odontophrynidae

Petropedetidae

Phrynobatrachidae

Pipidae

Pyxicephalidae

Ranidae

Ranixalidae

Rhacophoridae

Sooglossidae

Telmatobiidae

Caudata

Ambystomatidae

Cryptobranchidae

Hynobiidae

Plethodontidae

Salamandridae

Gymnophiona

Scolecomorphidae

Aves

Accipitriformes

Accipitridae

Anseriformes

Anatidae

Apodiformes

Trochilidae

Bucerotiformes

Bucerotidae

Caprimulgiformes

Aegothelidae

Caprimulgidae

Cathartiformes

Cathartidae

Charadriiformes

Charadriidae

Glareolidae

Laridae

Pedionomidae

Recurvirostridae

Scolopacidae

Turnicidae

Columbiformes

Columbidae

Coraciiformes

Alcedinidae

Cuculiformes

Cuculidae

Galliformes

Cracidae

Phasianidae

Gruiformes

Gruidae

Psophiidae

Rallidae

Otidiformes

Otididae

Passeriformes

Acrocephalidae

Alaudidae

Callaeidae

Campephagidae

Cisticolidae

Corvidae

Cotingidae

Dicaeidae

Emberizidae

Fringillidae

Furnariidae

Grallariidae

Hirundinidae

Icteridae

Laniidae

Leiothrichidae

Macrosphenidae

Meliphagidae

Mimidae

Monarchidae

Muscicapidae

Oriolidae

Pachycephalidae

Parulidae

Passerellidae

Pipridae

Pycnonotidae

Rhinocryptidae

Sturnidae

Thamnophilidae

Thraupidae

Troglodytidae

Turdidae

Tyrannidae

Zosteropidae

Pelecaniformes

Ardeidae

Threskiornithidae

Piciformes

Picidae

Podicipediformes

Podicipedidae

Procellariiformes

Diomedeidae

Hydrobatidae

Oceanitidae

Procellariidae

Psittaciformes

Cacatuidae

Psittacidae

Strigopidae

Strigiformes

Strigidae

Suliformes

Fregatidae

Phalacrocoracidae

Cephalaspidomorphi

Petromyzontiformes

Petromyzontidae

Chondrichthyes

Carcharhiniformes

Carcharhinidae

Scyliorhinidae

Triakidae

Lamniformes

Lamnidae

Odontaspididae

Myliobatiformes

Dasyatidae

Rajiformes

Narcinidae

Narkidae

Rajidae

Torpedinidae

Urolophidae

Rhinopristiformes

Pristidae

Rhinobatidae

Squaliformes

Squalidae

Squatiniformes

Squatinidae

Mammalia

Afrosoricida

Chrysochloridae

Carnivora

Canidae

Felidae

Mustelidae

Procyonidae

Viverridae

Cetartiodactyla

Balaenidae

Balaenopteridae

Bovidae

Camelidae

Cervidae

Delphinidae

Eschrichtiidae

Lipotidae

Monodontidae

Phocoenidae

Suidae

Chiroptera

Emballonuridae

Hipposideridae

Megadermatidae

Mystacinidae

Natalidae

Phyllostomidae

Pteropodidae

Rhinolophidae

Vespertilionidae

Dasyuromorphia

Dasyuridae

Didelphimorphia

Didelphidae

Diprotodontia

Burramyidae

Macropodidae

Petauridae

Phalangeridae

Potoroidae

Pseudocheiridae

Vombatidae

Eulipotyphla

Soricidae

Lagomorpha

Leporidae

Monotremata

Tachyglossidae

Perissodactyla

Equidae

Rhinocerotidae

Pholidota

Manidae

Pilosa

Bradypodidae

Primates

Atelidae

Callitrichidae

Cebidae

Cercopithecidae

Cheirogaleidae

Galagidae

Hominidae

Hylobatidae

Indriidae

Lemuridae

Lepilemuridae

Lorisidae

Pitheciidae

Tarsiidae

Proboscidea

Elephantidae

Rodentia

Abrocomidae

Capromyidae

Caviidae

Cricetidae

Ctenomyidae

Dasyproctidae

Echimyidae

Geomyidae

Heteromyidae

Muridae

Nesomyidae

Octodontidae

Sciuridae

Myxini

Myxiniformes

Myxinidae

Reptilia

Crocodylia

Alligatoridae

Crocodylidae

Gavialidae

Squamata

Agamidae

Amphisbaenidae

Anguidae

Boidae

Calamariidae

Carphodactylidae

Chamaeleonidae

Colubridae

Dactyloidae

Diplodactylidae

Dipsadidae

Elapidae

Eublepharidae

Gekkonidae

Gymnophthalmidae

Iguanidae

Lacertidae

Leiosauridae

Leptotyphlopidae

Liolaemidae

Natricidae

Phrynosomatidae

Phyllodactylidae

Prosymnidae

Pseudoxyrhophiidae

Scincidae

Sphaerodactylidae

Teiidae

Tropidophiidae

Tropiduridae

Typhlopidae

Varanidae

Viperidae

Xenodermatidae

Testudines

Chelidae

Cheloniidae

Dermatemydidae

Dermochelyidae

Emydidae

Geoemydidae

Kinosternidae

Pelomedusidae

Podocnemididae

Testudinidae

Trionychidae

Sarcopterygii

Coelacanthiformes

Latimeriidae

Cnidaria

Anthozoa

Scleractinia

Acroporidae

Dendrophylliidae

Poritidae

Siderastreidae

Hydrozoa

Milleporina

Milleporidae

Mollusca

Bivalvia

Unionida

Etheriidae

Hyriidae

Iridinidae

Margaritiferidae

Unionidae

Venerida

Dreissenidae

Sphaeriidae

Cephalopoda

Octopoda

Opisthoteuthidae

Gastropoda

Allogastropoda

Valvatidae

Architaenioglossa

Aciculidae

Ampullariidae

Cyclophoridae

Diplommatinidae

Neocyclotidae

Pupinidae

Viviparidae

Cycloneritimorpha

Helicinidae

Neritidae

Hygrophila

Acroloxidae

Lymnaeidae

Physidae

Planorbidae

Littorinimorpha

Assimineidae

Bithyniidae

Cochliopidae

Hydrobiidae

Moitessieriidae

Pomatiopsidae

Neogastropoda

Conidae

Sacoglossa

Siphonariidae

Sorbeoconcha

Melanopsidae

Pachychilidae

Paludomidae

Pleuroceridae

Thiaridae

Stylommatophora

Achatinellidae

Amastridae

Arionidae

Bradybaenidae

Cerastidae

Cerionidae

Charopidae

Clausiliidae

Cochlicellidae

Cochlicopidae

Discidae

Draparnaudiidae

Dyakiidae

Endodontidae

Enidae

Euconulidae

Ferussaciidae

Gastrodontidae

Helicarionidae

Helicidae

Helicodiscidae

Helminthoglyptidae

Hygromiidae

Lauriidae

Milacidae

Orculidae

Oreohelicidae

Orthalicidae

Oxychilidae

Parmacellidae

Partulidae

Polygyridae

Pristilomatidae

Pupillidae

Rhytididae

Streptaxidae

Strophocheilidae

Succineidae

Trochomorphidae

Vertiginidae

Vitrinidae

Zonitidae

Vetigastropoda

Haliotidae

Nemertina

Enopla

Hoplonemertea

Prosorhochmidae

Onychophora

Onychophora

Onychophora

Peripatidae

Peripatopsidae

References

.
.Animalia